Wamanrasu (Quechua waman falcon or variable hawk, Ancash Quechua rasu snow, ice, mountain with snow, Hispanicized spellings Huamanrazo, Huamanrazu) is a mountain in the Chunta mountain range in the Andes of Peru, about  high. It is located in the Huancavelica Region, Castrovirreyna Province, Santa Ana District and in the Huancavelica Province, Huancavelica District. Wamanrasu lies northeast of the mountain Antarasu and northwest of the mountain Qarwarasu (Carhuarazo) of the Huancavelica Region.

The local peasants consider Wamanrasu to be the mightiest Apu of the region.

References

Mountains of Peru
Mountains of Huancavelica Region